The 2016 Junior World Rally Championship was the fifteenth season of the Junior World Rally Championship, an auto racing championship recognized by the Fédération Internationale de l'Automobile, running in support of the World Rally Championship.

The Junior World Rally Championship was open to drivers under the age of twenty-eight. All teams contested six nominated European events, with all of their scores counting towards their final championship position. The drivers competed in identical Citroën DS3 R3Ts with the 2014 homologated MAX Kit, using Michelin tyres. The winner received a programme of six rallies in Europe in a Citroën DS3 R5, competing in the 2016 FIA WRC2 championship.

Calendar

The final 2016 Junior World Rally Championship calendar consisted of six European events (one less than 2015), taken from the 2016 World Rally Championship.

Calendar changes

 The total number of events will be six, one less than in 2015. 
 Monte Carlo Rally and Rally de Catalunya were dropped in favor of Rallye Deutschland.

Drivers

The following drivers competed in the championship.

Results and standings

Season summary

FIA Junior World Rally Championship for Drivers

Points are awarded to the top ten classified finishers.

FIA Junior World Rally Championship for Co-Drivers

FIA Junior World Rally Championship for Nations

References

External links
Official website of the World Rally Championship
Official website of the Fédération Internationale de l'Automobile

2016 in rallying